The 1935 Chatham Cup was the 13th annual nationwide knockout football competition in New Zealand.

The competition was run on a regional basis, with regional associations each holding separate qualifying rounds.

Teams taking part in the final rounds are known to have included Ponsonby, Hamilton Wanderers, Western (Christchurch), and Hospital (Wellington).

The 1935 final
In the final, in front of a crowd of around 5,500, Hospital scored after just nine minutes through W. McGrory and Billy Woods added a second for a half-time lead of two goals to nil. A third was added from the penalty spot by A. Gibb midway through the second half. Hospital conceded a late consolation goal from Merv Gordon. The referee, W.P. Smith of Otago, was the first non-Wellingtonian to control a final.

Results

Semi-finals ("Island finals")

Final

References

Rec.Sport.Soccer Statistics Foundation New Zealand 1935 page

Chatham Cup
Chatham Cup
Chatham Cup